Johnny Reginald Davis (born October 21, 1955) is an American former professional basketball player and coach in the National Basketball Association (NBA). He played in the NBA with four teams in ten years from 1976 to 1986, winning an NBA championship in his rookie season (1976–77) with the Portland Trail Blazers. He also played for the Indiana Pacers, the Atlanta Hawks, and the Cleveland Cavaliers.

In 1996–97 NBA season Davis coached the Philadelphia 76ers, and he coached the Orlando Magic for nearly two seasons from 2003 to 2005. On June 21, 2007, he was named assistant coach by new Grizzlies head coach Marc Iavaroni. Davis had previously served as an assistant coach with the Atlanta Hawks, Los Angeles Clippers, Portland Trail Blazers, New Jersey Nets, Orlando Magic, Minnesota Timberwolves, Indiana Pacers, Memphis Grizzlies, Toronto Raptors, and Los Angeles Lakers.

On January 22, 2009, Iavaroni was fired by Memphis GM Chris Wallace, and Davis was named interim head coach of the Grizzlies. On January 25, Lionel Hollins—Davis' teammate on the 1977 Portland team—was named Memphis' head coach, with Davis going back to his old job as an assistant coach. From 2011 to 2013, Davis worked as an assistant with the Toronto Raptors.

Head coaching record

|-
| style="text-align:left;"|Philadelphia
| style="text-align:left;"|
|82||22||60|||| align="center"|6th in Atlantic|||—||—||—||—
| style="text-align:center;"|Missed playoffs
|-
| style="text-align:left;"|Orlando
| style="text-align:left;"|
|71||20||51|||| align="center"|7th in Atlantic|||—||—||—||—
| style="text-align:center;"|Missed playoffs
|-
| style="text-align:left;"|Orlando
| style="text-align:left;"|
|64||31||33|||| align="center"|(fired)|||—||—||—||—
| style="text-align:center;"|—
|-
| style="text-align:left;"|Memphis
| style="text-align:left;"|
|2||0||2|||| align="center"|(interim)|||—||—||—||—
| style="text-align:center;"|—
|- class="sortbottom"
| style="text-align:left;"|Career
| ||219||73||146|||| ||—||—||—||—||

References

External links
 Career statistics (as a player)
 Career statistics (as a coach)

1955 births
Living people
African-American basketball coaches
African-American basketball players
American expatriate basketball people in Canada
American men's basketball coaches
American men's basketball players
Atlanta Hawks assistant coaches
Atlanta Hawks players
Basketball coaches from Michigan
Basketball players at the 1975 Pan American Games
Basketball players from Detroit
Cleveland Cavaliers players
Dayton Flyers men's basketball players
Indiana Pacers assistant coaches
Indiana Pacers players
Los Angeles Clippers assistant coaches
Los Angeles Lakers assistant coaches
Medalists at the 1975 Pan American Games
Memphis Grizzlies assistant coaches
Memphis Grizzlies head coaches
Minnesota Timberwolves assistant coaches
Murray–Wright High School alumni
New Jersey Nets assistant coaches
Orlando Magic assistant coaches
Orlando Magic head coaches
Pan American Games gold medalists for the United States
Pan American Games medalists in basketball
Philadelphia 76ers head coaches
Point guards
Portland Trail Blazers assistant coaches
Portland Trail Blazers draft picks
Portland Trail Blazers players
Toronto Raptors assistant coaches
21st-century African-American people
20th-century African-American sportspeople